Dolgin may refer to:

a trade name of the drug Ibuprofen
Bryan Dolgin, American sportscaster
Gail Dolgin, American filmmaker
Janet L. Dolgin, American legal scholar
Josh Dolgin, Canadian rap artist
Kalmon Dolgin, American real estate developer
Stephen Dolgin, American pediatric surgeon